Nelli Dvalishvili (Nelly Goginashvili) is a former competitive figure skater who represented the Soviet Union. She placed 4th at 1983 World Junior Championships, held in December 1982 in Sarajevo, Yugoslavia. After retiring from competition, she became a skating coach. She works now as a coach in Israel.

Personal life 
Nelli Dvalishvili was born in 1968 in Georgia. She began skating at age five.

References 

1968 births
Living people
Female single skaters from Georgia (country)